Thomas James Marrow (born 23 November 1966) is a British scientist who is a professor of nuclear materials science at the University of Oxford and holds the James Martin Chair in Energy Materials. He specialises in physical metallurgy, micromechanics, and X-ray crystallography of engineering materials, mainly ceramic matrix composite and nuclear graphite.

Early life and education 
James Marrow was born on 23 November 1966 in Bromborough, Wirral to John Williams Marrow and Mary Elizabeth Marrow. He attended Wirral Grammar School for Boys, then graduated with a 1st Class Honours Master of Arts (M.A) in Natural Sciences (Materials Science) from the University of Cambridge in 1988, where he was a student at Clare College, Cambridge before pursuing and completing a Doctor of Philosophy degree in 1991. During his PhD, he studied the Fatigue mechanisms in embrittled duplex stainless steel and was supervised by Julia King.

Career 
From 1992 to 1993, Marrow was appointed as postdoctoral research associate in the Department of Materials, University of Oxford, and a junior research fellow at Linacre College, Oxford, but moved with an Engineering and Physical Sciences Research Council (EPSRC) postdoctoral research fellowship to the School of Metallurgy and Materials, University of Birmingham. In 2001, he joined the Manchester Materials Science Centre, University of Manchester, as senior lecturer in Physical Metallurgy, where he became assistant director of Materials Performance Centre in 2002 and the director in 2009. 

Marrow moved to University of Oxford to become Oxford Martin School co-director of the Oxford Martin Programme in Nuclear and Energy Materials from 2010 to 2015, Professor in Energy Materials, Department of Materials, Oxford University, and Fellow of Mansfield College, Oxford. , Marrow is the Associate Head of Department of Materials (Teaching).

Marrow is a council member of the UK Forum for Engineering Structural Integrity (FESI), UK representative for the European Energy Research Alliance Joint Programme on Nuclear Materials, member (ex-chair) of the OECD-NEA Expert Group on Innovative Structural Materials, independent advisor to the UK Office of Nuclear Regulation on materials/structural integrity, and UK representative on Graphite for BEIS to the Generation IV International Forum. Marrow is the co-director of the Nuclear Research Centre (NRC), which is a joint venture between the University of Bristol and the University of Oxford to train new nuclear scientists and engineers.

Research 
Morrow's research focuses on the degradation of structural materials, the role of microstructure, and the mechanisms of materials ageing. A key aspect is the investigation of fundamental mechanisms of damage accumulation - including irradiation - using novel materials characterisation techniques. This has concentrated recently on computed X-ray tomography and strain mapping by digital image correlation and digital volume correlation, together with X-ray and neutron diffraction. He applies these techniques to studies of the degradation of Generation IV nuclear materials such as graphite and silicon carbide composites, as well as new materials for electrical energy storage.

Public engagement 
Morrow is part of I'm a Scientist, Get me out of here! energy generation zone. He has also been a key developer and academic consultant for the Dissemination of IT for the Promotion of Materials Science (DoITPoMS). Global Cycle Network Technology (GCN Tech) interviewed  James about carbon fibre fatigue and strain.

Personal life 
Morrow married Daiva Kojelyte in 1998 and he is a father of a son and a daughter.

Selected publications 
 Becker TH, Mostafavi M, Tait RB, Marrow TJ. An approach to calculate the J-integral by digital image correlation displacement field measurement. Fatigue Fract Eng Mater Struct 2012;35:971–84. https://doi.org/10.1111/J.1460-2695.2012.01685.X.
 Kasemchainan J, Zekoll S, Spencer Jolly D, Ning Z, Hartley GO, Marrow J, et al. Critical stripping current leads to dendrite formation on plating in lithium anode solid electrolyte cells. Nature Materials 2019 18:10 2019;18:1105–11. https://doi.org/10.1038/s41563-019-0438-9.
 King A, Johnson G, Engelberg D, Ludwig W, Marrow J. Observations of intergranular stress corrosion cracking in a grain-mapped polycrystal. Science (1979) 2008;321:382–5. https://doi.org/10.1126/SCIENCE.1156211/SUPPL_FILE/KING.SOM.PDF.
 Marrow TJ, Babout L, Jivkov AP, Wood P, Engelberg D, Stevens N, et al. Three dimensional observations and modelling of intergranular stress corrosion cracking in austenitic stainless steel. Journal of Nuclear Materials 2006;352:62–74. https://doi.org/10.1016/J.JNUCMAT.2006.02.042.

See also 
 Philip J. Withers
 Who's Who (UK)

References

External links 
 Professor James Marrow at the Oxford Martin School
 James Marrow at Department of Materials, University of Oxford

British materials scientists
Academics of the University of Oxford
1966 births
Living people
British nuclear engineers
Metallurgists
Alumni of the University of Cambridge